Nidularium espiritosantense is a plant species in the genus Nidularium. This species is endemic to Brazil.

References

espiritosantense
Flora of Brazil